The Kyoto Nisai Stakes is a Grade 3 horse race for two-year-old Thoroughbreds run in November over a distance of 2000 metres at Kyoto Racecourse.

The race was first run in 1959 and was promoted to Grade 3 status in 2014. It was run over a variety of distances but has been contested over 2000 metres since 2002. Past winners have included Narita Brian, Victoire Pisa and Epiphaneia.

Winners since 2014  

 The 2021 & 2022 race took place at Hanshin Racecourse.

Earlier winners

 2002 – Eishin Champ
 2003 – Mystic Age
 2004 – Rosenkreuz
 2005 – Maruka Schenk
 2006 – Gold Kirishima
 2007 – Al Kazan
 2008 – Executive
 2009 – Victoire Pisa
 2010 – Marvelous Kaiser
 2011 – Trip
 2012 – Epiphaneia
 2013 – Tosen Stardom

See also
 Horse racing in Japan
 List of Japanese flat horse races

References

Turf races in Japan
1959 establishments in Japan
Recurring sporting events established in 1959